

Events
 Duke Zhuang of the Chinese state of Chang comes to power.
 Beginning of the First Messenian War.

Births

Deaths

References

740s BC